Gitte Lillelund Bech (born 21 January 1969) is a Danish politician who has been Defence Minister representing the Liberal party, Venstre. She entered office in January 2010, when she replaced Søren Gade after a cabinet reshuffle.

References
 

1969 births
Living people
Danish Defence Ministers
Female defence ministers
Members of the Folketing 1998–2001
Members of the Folketing 2001–2005
Members of the Folketing 2005–2007
Members of the Folketing 2007–2011
Members of the Folketing 2011–2015
Venstre (Denmark) politicians
Women members of the Folketing
People from Aarhus
21st-century Danish women politicians
Women government ministers of Denmark